Westfield Township, Ohio may refer to:

Westfield Township, Medina County, Ohio
Westfield Township, Morrow County, Ohio

Ohio township disambiguation pages